KZDV (99.5 FM) is a radio station licensed to Rattan, Oklahoma, United States. The station is currently owned by Will Payne

History
This station was assigned call sign KZDV on November 19, 2012.

References

External links
http://www.k955.com/kzdv/

Contemporary Christian radio stations in the United States
Radio stations established in 2012
ZDV